Duhon is a surname, and may refer to:
Chris Duhon (born 1982), American basketball player
Edwin Duhon (1910–2006), American musician
Josh Duhon (born 1984), American actor
Nathan Duhon (born 1969), Entertainment